Saudi Arabian art should be understood in the light of the country being the birthplace of Islam and to include both the arts of Bedouin nomads and those of the sedentary peoples of regions such as the Hejaz, Tihamah, Asir and Najd.

Architecture

The first mosque of Islam was the house of the Islamic prophet Mohammed in Medina. When it was first built by prophets Muhammad and his companions, it was made of simple blocks. However, as time passes and different Muslim empires and rulers were honored to role Medina, the mosque has been subjected to different constructions. The last one of them is that done by the Saudi different kings. The current construction  is the prototype of all later sacred architecture of Islam. The current design of the mosque pays great attention to all details. Apparently and most importantly, the floor and carpet that are touched in prayer with the head. There are different regional styles of architecture in Saudi Arabia, and they are divided into different styles. In the Najd region, most buildings are made of mud-brick covered by mud-plaster. In the Hijaz region, most buildings are made of coral rag and wood, with roofs made of palm thatch and wooden beams. There are many Ottoman influences on the architecture in this region.

In the Al-Hufud regions, the houses are usually two or three stories and they surround a central courtyard.

In the Asir region, many houses are made of rough-cut stone, and other houses are made of a stone and mud combination.

Visual arts

Tribal symbols referred to as "wusum" were carved by Bedouins during prehistoric times and are found as rock art in the hills and deserts of Arabia. During the years 1985–1990l there was a rock art and epigraphic survey of Saudi Arabia. During this time, over 1000 rock art sites were recorded. In the earlier stages of rock art, there were large human and animal faces, and in the later stages the human and animals faces were smaller.

Decoration art 

The art of decoration is a fundamental element of identity in the region of Asir. Al-Qatt Al-Asiri, an inscribed artwork on UNESCO's Intangible Cultural Heritage of Humanity, is an ancient art form popular in Asir region where the white interior walls of homes painted with various patterns of symbols and geometric shapes. The tradition of house-painting is unique to women in the region, as the home is considered the female domain.

Art Movement
The Art Movement in Saudi Arabia started in the mid 60's by a group of School Art Teachers and lasted till mid 80's.

In 1972, Mohammed Said Farsi became the mayor of the coastal city of Jeddah, making the city one of the largest open-air art galleries in the world.

Portable art forms 
There are many portable art forms in Saudi Arabia. For example, there is metalware, jewelry, pottery and leatherwork. Even today, many Bedouin women weave, and they make brightly colored striped rugs, camel trapping and tents. The tents are black and are made of goat-hair, mixed with sheep's wool and camel-hair.

Art Exhibitions 
A number of art exhibitions are organized in Saudi Arabia.

International Art Exhibition 
In April 2019, an international art exhibition was organized in Jeddah at the Abdullah Al-Qasabi Gallery of the Saudi Fine Art Center. The exhibition displayed art work from Saudi Arabia as well as seven other countries.

“Landscapes of the Soul” 
An exhibition was held at the King Abdulaziz Center for World Culture (Ithra) to display Forty pieces by Norwegian artist Edvard Munch. Munch's displayed pieces reflect on his personal life experiences of misery, love, despair, loneliness and reflections of the soul. The exhibition displayed lithograph versions of Munch's famous paintings including, “The Scream”,  “Summer Night. The Voice”,  “Self-Portrait” and “The Sick Child”.

Bait Al-Hodaif 
It is a small art museum and a non-profit art organization based in Jeddah. It is made up of 14 rooms that display art pieces from the 1910s to the 1980s. It aims at promoting the culture of art in Saudi Arabia by holding many events and exhibitions.

Shara Art Fair 
Shara Art Fair is an art exhibition organized by the Saudi Art Council. It is specialized in showcasing a collection of artistic paintings and pieces from different areas and fields. The fair aims at marketing new artists and selling their products as well as supporting emerging artists.

Canvash Studio 
Canvash is an art studio and exhibition established by the Saudi Artist, Maysa bint Ahmed Al-Ruwaished. The studio, that located in the Eastern province of Saudi Arabia, aims to reflect the culture of the Saudi society. Moreover, the studio holds a number of workshops to educate Saudi young artists and spread the culture of art appreciation.

Arts Academies 
Three academies dedicated to arts, heritage, and music, will be established in the country to receive students and trainees applications. The academies come as part of the Quality of Life Program initiatives and will be offering qualifications in arts.

See also

 Contemporary Saudi Arabian female artists

Bibliography
 Majeed Khan: Wusum, the tribal symbols of Saudi Arabia, Kingdom of Saudi Arabia, Ministry of Education, 2000.
 Anthony Ham a.o.: Saudi Arabia, Lonely Planet, 200 hi hi hi hiy Mosque, Makkah, London, 1998.
 Robert Hillenbrand: Islamic Art and Architecture, Thames & Hudson, London, 2004 (1999).
 Marcel Kurpershoek: De laatste bedoeïen'', Amsterdam, 1995.

References

Saudi Arabia